The Gothia Cup is an international youth association football tournament organized by professional football club BK Häcken, which has been held annually since 1975 in Gothenburg, Sweden. Considered the biggest tournament in the world in terms of participating teams, competing youth teams throughout the world enter the competition. The Gothia Cup is also Sweden's largest annual event. The Jamie Johnson (TV series) in Series 4 displays Phoenix FC, a grassroots football club competing in the Gothia Cup.

Overview
 
Spanning one week the Gothia Cup is a youth association football tournament held annually in Gothenburg, Sweden, open for both boys and girls of ages 11 to 18. In terms of participants, it is the world's second largest youth football tournament with only the Norway Cup being bigger. In 2017, 1730 teams from 82 nations participated.

The Gothia Cup started in 1975 with 275 participating teams.
In July each year, the event becomes the dominant event in Gothenburg, with (as of 2017) 4,349 games played on 110 fields, and 300,000 visitors to the center in Heden. According to the tourist authorities of Gothenburg, the 2006 Gothia Cup generated 282 million Swedish krona in tourist income for Gothenburg city and 118 million krona in tax income for Sweden.

Teams compete from across the world; such as from Brazil, United Arab Emirates, Bangladesh and the Czech Republic.

In 2020, for the first time since the tournament's inaugural season, the tournament was not held, due to the COVID-19 pandemic in Sweden.

Gothia Cup China 
The concept of Gothia Cup was exported to China in the 2010s. From 2016, the Gothia Cup had a sister tournament in Shenyang, China, known as the Gothia Cup China.
The first Gothia Cup China began between 13 and 19 August 2016. At the newly built Gothia Cup Football park the Tournament saw 250 participating teams from 20 nations.

Famous participants
This list includes notable players who played in Gothia Cup in their youth and later had been playing for their national teams.

  Emmanuel Adebayor (with Les Eperviers)
  Xabi Alonso (with Antiguoko)
  Joel Asoro (won with IF Brommapojkarna 2010)
  Júlio Baptista (with Pequeninos do Jockey)
  Yassine Bounou (with Wydad AC)
  Gordon Durie (with Hill of Beath Swifts)
  Marco Etcheverry (with AD Tahuichi)
  Tobias Hysén
  Zlatan Ibrahimović 
  Odilon Kossounou (with ASEC Mimosas)
  Dejan Kulusevski (won with IF Brommapojkarna 2010)
  Kim Källström won with BK Häcken 1997 (with Partille IF 1996)
  Egy Maulana Vikri (with ASIOP Apacinti)
  Fabián Orellana (with CSD Colo Colo)
  Andrea Pirlo (won with US Voluntas)
  Erwin Sánchez (with AD Tahuichi)
  Slobodan Savić (with Jugović Kać)
  Alan Shearer (with Wellington Juniors)
  Gylfi Sigurdsson (with Fimleikafelag Hafnarfjarðar F.H.)
  Bruno Viana (with Cruzeiro Esporte Clube)
  Cristian Zaccardo (with FC Spilamberto)
  Zé Roberto (with Pequeninos do Jockey)

See also
 List of sporting events in Sweden

References

External links
 
 Worldstride Excel

International sports competitions in Gothenburg
Football (association)
Football cup competitions in Sweden
Youth in Sweden
1975 establishments in Sweden
Recurring sporting events established in 1975
July sporting events
Youth football in Sweden